Zoltán Herczeg (born September 24, 1972 in Szerencs) Hungarian fashion designer, brand and company owner, founder of "Herczeg Fashion House" – 1997 and "Herczeg Empire" – 2014.

His professional career sprung from early provocative party design and unique, custom-made stage costumes for mainstream Hungarian artists and musicians. As his name and status evolved and his collections began to be reckoned with, he was often asked to design and produce outfits for well known worldwide brands. Spanning through a decade and a half his career elevated him to be one of the best known names in Hungarian design circles. Known for his zest and notoriously rampant creative drive he is in constant search for the truly self-defining path. His collections and fashion shows never lack in exuberance and shock value, re-inventing himself every time despite the unusually high number of events (3–4 shows per year).

His inspiration is rooted in various branches of art – music at the top – and in a famously hedonistic outlook on life often leaning towards sarcasm and self-irony. A favorite with reporters and journalists he needs no more than a microphone to open up on his views with often unvarnished bluntness.

An avid traveller he kept his fans engaged from London, Paris, Peking and Bangkok first through his personal blog, later on his own website. He is a frequent personality on TV, radio, in universities, in Madrid and Milano.In 2009 he receives a surprise phone call: Michael Madsen is in his store and in urgent need of designer clothes to receive a movie award in Portugal the next day. The movie star is so taken with "Herczeg"'s unique style that they immediately strike both a personal and professional bond. A few days later on a business lunch in a Budapest restaurant their fashion brand is born called "Badass by Michael Madsen".

Life

Childhood 
Born September 1972 in Szerencs, Hungary. Growing up in a peaceful and loving family he preferred to dedicate his time to reading, drawing and creating at home rather than hanging out with friends after school. His first "fashion statement" is an outfit for a favorite Teddy Bear, followed by satchels for small items, small bags stitched together from scraps on his mother's sewing machine, later cutting up jeans just to create bags. He's an all A student. Later studies in High School specialized in Commerce, and falls in love with Rock music in all its then current shapes and forms. His favorite is Anthrax. He wants to dress like them and gets his girlfriend to make the typical Anthrax surf shorts and jeans then inaccessible in Hungary.

Beginning 
Attends the Corvinus University of Economics. His wardrobe at this point contains little that he did not create or re-create himself. He loves to shock, to melt into the city life and nightlife. After a short stab at modeling he ends up on the creating side. As a childhood friend of the famous rock band "Hooligans" he lands his first commissions for designing stage-wear. He also creates new stage design for popular funk band "Back II Black". His name and his references quickly spread in music circles. Upon his friends' enthusiastic urge he takes a loan and designs/produces his first collection to be shown on a small town catwalk. In 1996 he rents a small store downtown Budapest, and his creations are finally showcased after lying around in bags on the dormitory floor. Soon he moves shop to a new location on Teréz Blv, where "Herczeg Férczművek" (Herczeg Stitchworks) officially opens under the still present "Herczeg Party Clothing" trade sign. 1998–  he founds "BYB" brand, 2000– founds the brand "Herczeg Zoltán".

Fashion revolutionist 
Hair-raising ideas and work ethics, active playboy lifestyle, unique marketing. He designs for himself and like-minded peers. Nominated at the 2005 "Fashion Awards Hungary as Young Designer of the Year", his acclaimed collections make it as far as the catwalks of Madrid. He explicitly designs for men, very seldom for women. He mainly uses musicians, singers, actors, dancers instead of professional models. He always strays from the usual and the expected. His shows always feature live music carefully picked to match the collection's image and feel. The show itself always transforms into an impromptu performance where the participants are free roam and express themselves in the clothes they personally picked, yet always achieving harmony and unconscious choreography despite the improvisation.

Fashion Shows

International shows 
 Korfu – (VIVA – 2003)
 Madrid- ( Luminex collection – 2004)
 Brussels – ( Rába swimwear – 2008 )
 Milan – ( Herczeg for Arato – 2012)

Local shows 
 Váci Merriness (1996)
 "Rakpart" (1997)
 Offline – PeCsa (2000)
 Budapest Fashion Week (2005)
 REVOLUTION Collection 
 Herczeg-Harley-Hooligans (2005)  
 Store opening (2005)
 10-year Herczeg anniversary – Jesus 33 collextion (2006)  
 Szerencs Chocolate Festival ( évente)
 Rock & Roll Collection (2007)
 The Card Collection – Napra – Gödör (2008)
 AXE (2009)
 Wamsler – Herczeg (2009)
 H1Z1- Virus collection  (2009)
 Haramina collection (2010)
 Trilak – Herczeg (2010)
 HERCZEG for SUGARBIRD (2010)
 Hungarian Badass (2011)
 15 years of Herczeg  (2011)
 Herczeg & Envy Summer Fashion Show (2012)

Movie and TV roles 
 Szerelem utolsó vérig  (Hungarian movie)
 10-year Herczegs anniversary DVD
 The jeans
 Fish on the cake season 1 (celebrity cooking show)
 Fish on the cake season 2
 Pokerstars.hu – Staracademy TV2

Juror 
 Miss Tourism World (2005–2006)
 Miss Alpok-Adria (2008–2010)
 Miss Hungary  (2009)
 Hajas Cut & Color Competition (2007–2012)
 Singers League TV2 (2007) TV SHOW
 Hungary's next Topmodell – Viasat (2009) TV Show

Awards 
 Best Dressed Band in Hungary – (Ifjúsági Magazin 1999)
 Young Designer of the Year nomination – ( Hungarian Fashion Awards – 2005)
 Man of The Style winner in "extravagant" category –  ( Playboy Magazin 2011)
 Red Bull Hungarian Ambassador (2006– )
 PUMA Hungarian Ambassador  (2010/2011)

 Public life 
 Brussels- Rába Swimwear 2008. Pollution protest show.
A simple misunderstanding from a Dutch representative at the European parliament deems a political campaign key-art "pornographic" and creates massive controversy, drawing unexpected attention to the so far diplomatically unresolved but environmentally critical pollution of Hungarian river Rába by an Austrian leather processing firm. The scandal forces the EU to change policy and draw stricter environmental restrictions.
 Fashion for Food Heim Pál Children's Hospital project – Lyfestile 
 "Picture on the Wall" exhibition opening speech – Kertész 29 Galéria fall exhibitiont
 Berencsi Attila (Beri Ary) artist and songwriter, concert and exhibition opening speech – Symbol
 Holmeless – Elephant charity public exhibition.Dressing the "Elephant of Fashion" together with other designers of Sugarbird.
 Guest speaker: Budapest School of Communication, topic: "personal branding". University of Pécs, ZEN ( University of Sound) topic: the relationship between fashion and rock & roll, " The Rock 'n Roll is not a dance, who is not his shirt, do not take it!" 
 Red Bull educational, informational training in the field of personal branding: University of Pécs és University of Szeged, Budapest Corvinus University
 Apolka film'' also directed the film premiere of unconventional fashion show in collaboration with famous fashion designers.
 Open letter to then Hungarian Prime Minister Ferenc Gyurcsány on the impossible state of the Hungarian light industry (2005).
 Various publications on his personal blog and other social platforms.

Private life 

His private life is an open book through his personal blog (launched in 2006), and social platforms, interviews, TV appearances and radio broadcasts. His birthdays and anniversaries are marked social events with musicians, composers, painters, actors, writers, comedians, reporters, designers, stylists, businessmen, models, photographers, hair stylists, make-up artists, sportsmen, fans, friends, family. I'm doing this for you!. Is not just a philosophy of life, but everyday practice.

Sources

More information 

1972 births
Hungarian fashion designers
Living people
People from Szerencs